The Premio Hemingway (Hemingway Prize) is an international arts award established by the municipality of Lignano Sabbiadoro, Italy in 1984.

Lignano, situated on a small peninsula between Venice and Trieste is a place where Ernest Hemingway spent much time.

Each year a jury awards a series of awards for excellence in literature and related fields. The awards are announced at a glittering ceremony in June. 

The Prize is promoted by the Municipality of Lignano Sabbiadoro with the support of the Departments of Culture and Productive Activities and Tourism of the Friuli Venezia Giulia Region and the Pordenonelegge Foundation which was founded in 2013 by the Chamber of Commerce of Pordenone and local trade associations.

Award winners
2019 
 Literature – Emmanuel Carrère
 Adventures of thought – Eva Cantarella
 Witness of our time – Federico Rampini
 Photography – Riccardo Zipoli
 Special Prize Citta di Lignano – Franca Leosini

2018
 Literature – Annie Ernaux 
 Adventure of thought – Antonio Damasio 
 Witness of our time – Lilli Gruber 
 Photography – Francesca Della Toffola

2017
 Literature – Zadie Smith 
 Adventure of thought – Slavoj Žižek 
 Witness of our time – Massimo Recalcati 
 Photography – Nino Migliori

2016
 Literature – Luis Sepúlveda 
 Adventure of thought – Massimo Cacciari 
 Life and work – Aharon Appelfeld 
 Photography – George Tatge

2015
 Literature – Corrado Augias 
 Adventure of thought – Richard Sennet 
 Photo book: Luca Campigotto 
 Reportage – William Dalrymple

2014
 Literature – Abraham Yehoshua 
 Adventure of thought – Zygmunt Bauman 
 Photo reportage – Alice Albinia 
 Photo book: Guido Guidi 

2013
 Literature – Giuseppe Furno
 Journalism – Shoma Chaudhury 
 Photo reportage – Yuri Kozyrev 
 Free spirit – Enrico Calamai 
 Special prize – Enea Fabris-Stralignano

References

Italian literary awards
1984 establishments in Italy
Awards established in 1984
Fiction awards
Ernest Hemingway